The Near Lady is a 1923 American silent comedy film directed by Herbert Blaché and written by Hugh Hoffman. The film stars Gladys Walton, Jerry Gendron, Hank Mann, Kate Price, Otis Harlan, and Florence Drew. The film was released on December 3, 1923, by Universal Pictures.

Plot
As described in a film magazine review, butcher Herman Schultz invents a sausage machine, becomes wealthy, and proposes to break into society with his family. His daughter Nora is selected to marry Basil Van Bibber, whose aristocratic folks have lost their money. They become engaged to please their parents, and then each falls in love with the other but tries to hide it. Basil attempts to disgust Nora by pretending to be drunk, but she sticks with him despite a family row and police threats. Finally, they admit their mutual love and are wed.

Cast          
Gladys Walton as Nora Schultz
Jerry Gendron as Basil Van Bibber
Hank Mann as Lodger
Kate Price as Bridget Schultz
Otis Harlan as Herman Schultz
Florence Drew as Aunt Maggie Mahaffey
Emmett King as Stuyvesant Van Bibber
Henrietta Floyd as Mrs. S. Van Bibber

References

External links

1923 films
1920s English-language films
Silent American comedy films
1923 comedy films
Universal Pictures films
Films directed by Herbert Blaché
American silent feature films
American black-and-white films
1920s American films